Vaghinak Galstyan (born 7 November 1973) is a retired Armenian Greco-Roman wrestler. He is a World Champion, winning gold in 2001. Galstyan was awarded the Honored Master of Sports of Armenia title in 2009.

Galstyan is only the second Wrestling World Champion in Greco-Roman wrestling from the independent Republic of Armenia, after Aghasi Manukyan. He was voted the Armenian Athlete of the Year for 2001. Galstyan also competed at the 2004 Summer Olympics and 2008 Summer Olympics.

He became the head of Armenia's sports organizations, sports and youth policy department of the Ministry of Sport and Youth Affairs in 2014. On 24 September 2015, he was awarded the Presidential Medal of Gratitude for his contributions.

References

External links
 Sports-Reference.com

1973 births
Living people
Sportspeople from Yerevan
Armenian wrestlers
Armenian male sport wrestlers
Wrestlers at the 2000 Summer Olympics
Wrestlers at the 2004 Summer Olympics
Olympic wrestlers of Armenia
World Wrestling Championships medalists
21st-century Armenian people